East Hodge is a village in Jackson Parish, Louisiana, United States. The population was 289 at the 2010 census, down from 366 at the 2000 census. It is part of the Ruston Micropolitan Statistical Area.

Geography
East Hodge is located in southwestern Jackson Parish at  (32.277046, -92.714955). It is bordered to the west by Hodge and to the northwest by North Hodge. U.S. Route 167, running through Hodge and North Hodge, leads north  to Quitman and south  to Jonesboro.

The village sits on high ground between the Dugdemona River to the northwest and the Little Dugdemona River to the south.

Demographics

As of the census of 2000, there were 366 people, 135 households, and 100 families residing in the village. The racial makeup of the village was 4.64% White, 95.08% African American and 0.27% Native American.

There were 135 households, out of which 39.3% had children under the age of 18 living with them, 29.6% were married couples living together, 43.0% had a female householder with no husband present, and 25.2% were non-families. 24.4% of all households were made up of individuals, and 11.9% had someone living alone who was 65 years of age or older. The average household size was 2.71 and the average family size was 3.22.

In the village, the population was spread out, with 37.4% under the age of 18, 9.3% from 18 to 24, 21.3% from 25 to 44, 20.8% from 45 to 64, and 11.2% who were 65 years of age or older. The median age was 28 years. For every 100 females, there were 71.8 males. For every 100 females age 18 and over, there were 63.6 males.

The median income for a household in the village was $11,786, and the median income for a family was $14,432. Males had a median income of $25,250 versus $12,159 for females. The per capita income for the village was $7,616. About 46.6% of families and 51.1% of the population were below the poverty line, including 66.4% of those under age 18 and 37.0% of those age 65 or over.

References

Villages in Jackson Parish, Louisiana
Villages in Louisiana
Villages in Ruston, Louisiana micropolitan area